EV Electra is a Lebanese start-up that works in manufacturing electric vehicles in Lebanon and the Middle East; which has established a center dedicated to research and development in the field of electric vehicles.  EV Electra emerged from Jihad Mohammed Investments Company to be an independent company with branches in Canada, Italy, Germany and the Netherlands to reflect its global presence, while the headquarter is in Khaldeh, Lebanon.

EV Electra made the first trial version of its sporty Quds Rise in June 2020. This version faced some modifications to appear in public in 2021 in its red color, with a golden emblem in the front representing the Dome of the Rock, bearing the phoenix bird known in Lebanon. The word "Rise" in the name of the car represents the rise of Lebanon from the effects of the explosion of Beirut port, and thus the rise of the phoenix.

EV Electra has designed many other vehicles in production such as the Quds Capital ES, Quds Nostrum EE, Suvectra and E-Cab to go public in 2023.

Founding 
EV Electra was established in 2017 by Lebanese-born Canadian-Palestinian businessman Jihad Mohammed. He is the Chairman and CEO of the company. The company has about 300 Lebanese and Palestinian employees.

The company faced many difficulties in its beginnings, especially in 2019 when the Coronavirus swept the world, stopping all business, especially in Italy, which was the only destination for the company’s electrical parts, forcing it to transfer dealings with France which facilitated collecting and manufacturing operations. The Quds Rise was seen on the streets of France and Europe in the summer of 2020, due to the conditions of the Coronavirus pandemic, which prevented its termination and the arrival of the trial version in Lebanon.

Specifications and features 
The Quds Rise's battery capacity was 50 kilowatts, and it will have special stations for recharging the batteries. The engine capacity was 125 kilowatts, with a power of 200 horsepower, and an acceleration of 2.9 seconds, with a top speed of 250 kilometers per hour, which enables it to travel 450 km without Recharge.

References

External links 

 

Companies of Lebanon
Companies established in 2017
Electric vehicle manufacturers
Car brands